Kranzberg railway station is a railway station in Namibia between the towns of Karibib and Usakos. It is part of the TransNamib Railway. At Kranzberg, the railway line from Windhoek splits; one line continues westwards to Swakopmund and Walvis Bay, the other one continues north-eastwards towards Omaruru and Tsumeb.

The Windhoek—Swakopmund line, commissioned during Imperial Germany's colonial rule of German South West Africa, reached Kranzberg in 1902. In 1914, this line was extended to Walvis Bay. In 1906, Kranzberg was connected to Otavi, a line that was later extended to Grootfontein (1908), Outjo (1921), and Oshikango (2004).

Kranzberg is connected to the south and east of Namibia via Windhoek.

See also
 Rail transport in Namibia

References

Railway stations in Namibia
TransNamib Railway
Buildings and structures in Erongo Region
1902 establishments in German South West Africa
Railway stations opened in 1902